Linus Hultström (born December 9, 1992) is a Swedish professional ice hockey defenceman. He is currently signed under contract with Linköping HC of the Swedish Hockey League (SHL).

Playing career 
A product of Vimmerby HC, Hultström joined the youth ranks of Linköpings HC in 2008. He made his debut in Sweden's top-flight Elitserien with the club's men's team during the 2009–10 Elitserien season. In October 2014, he signed with another Elitserien team, Leksands IF, before moving on to Djurgårdens IF, where he inked a three-year deal in April 2015.

Hultström made 60 appearances for the Stockholm-based team during the 2015–16 season, tallying 15 goals and 28 assists. He also saw action in eight contests of the Champions Hockey League (two goals, four assists).

On May 3, 2016, he put pen to paper on a two-year, entry-level contract with the Florida Panthers of the National Hockey League (NHL). He was returned on loan to Djurgårdens IF for the first season of his contract with the Panthers, in 2016–17. He remained in the SHL for the entire duration of his contract with the Panthers, eventually signing a two-year contract extension with Djurgårdens IF on January 10, 2017.

As a free agent following the shortened 2019–20 season due to the COVID-19, Hultström left Sweden for the first time in his professional career by agreeing to a two-year contract with Russian club, HC Vityaz of the KHL, on May 2, 2020. In the 2020–21 season, Hultström quickly adapted to the new league, continuing to produce on the blueline in posting seven goals and 23 points through 53 regular season games.

On May 1, 2021, Hultström left Vityaz after just one year, remaining in the KHL by agreeing to a one-year contract with Metallurg Magnitogorsk. During his lone season with Metallurg in 2021–22, Hultström recorded a career-high of 24 assists, in posting 28 points through 48 regular season games. In the post-season, he added a further 7 points from the blueline before losing in the Gagarin Cup finals to CSKA Moscow.

As a free agent, Hultström left the KHL and returned to his original club, Linköping HC of the SHL, signing a four-year contract on May 4, 2022.

Career statistics

Regular season and playoffs

International

References

External links

1992 births
Living people
Djurgårdens IF Hockey players
Leksands IF players
Linköping HC players
Metallurg Magnitogorsk players
IK Oskarshamn players
Swedish ice hockey defencemen
HC Vityaz players
Ice hockey players at the 2022 Winter Olympics
Olympic ice hockey players of Sweden